Cara Carmichael Aitchison,  (born 1965) is a British human geographer and academic. Since 2016, she has been President and Vice Chancellor of Cardiff Metropolitan University. Having worked in academic and academic administrative appointments at multiple university, she was vice-chancellor and chief executive of the University of St Mark and St John, Plymouth from 2013 to 2016.

Early life and education
Aitchison was born in 1965 in Falkirk, Scotland, and educated at Stirling High School. She studied geography at the University of Edinburgh, graduating with an undergraduate Master of Arts (MA Hons) degree in 1987. She continued her studies at the university's Moray House School of Education, completing a postgraduate diploma (PG Dip) in recreation and leisure practice in 1988. Over the following years, she gained other qualifications: a Certificate in Education (CertEd) in further and higher education from Thames Polytechnic in 1990, and a Master of Arts (MA) degree in gender and society from Middlesex University in 1993. She undertook a Doctor of Philosophy (PhD) degree in social science at the University of Bristol, completing it in 1999 with a thesis titled "Leisure Studies: Gender, Power and Knowledge".

Academic career
Aitchison taught at Croydon College, the University of North London and the University of Gloucestershire, before becoming Professor in Human Geography at the University of West England (2003–2008). She then joined the University of Bedfordshire in academic and academic administration appointments, serving as dean of its Faculty of Education and Sport and Professor in Leisure and Tourism Studies from 2008 to 2010. She moved to the University of Edinburgh as head of its Moray House School of Education and Chair in Social and Environmental Justice from 2010 to 2013.

In 2013, Aitchison was appointed to lead her first university, serving as vice-chancellor and chief executive of the University of St Mark and St John, Plymouth between 2013 and 2016. She has also been an honorary professor at the University of Bath since 2015. In 2016, she joined Cardiff Metropolitan University as its president and vice-chancellor, and also Professor of Geography and Cultural Economy.

Books
Aitchison's books include:
Leisure and Tourism Landscapes: Social and Cultural Geographies (with Nicola E. MacLeod and Stephen J. Shaw, Routledge, 2000)
Gender and Leisure: Social and Cultural Perspectives (Routledge, 2003)
Urban Transformations: Regeneration and Renewal Through Leisure and Tourism (with Greg Richards and Andrew Tallon, Leisure Studies Association, 2007)
Sport and Gender Identities: Masculinities, Femininities and Sexualities (edited, Routledge, 2007)

References

External links

Fellows of the Academy of Social Sciences
Fellows of the Royal Geographical Society
Fellows of the Higher Education Academy
British women scientists
Living people
People associated with Cardiff Metropolitan University
People associated with Plymouth Marjon University
People from Falkirk
People educated at Stirling High School
Alumni of the University of Edinburgh
Alumni of the University of Greenwich
Alumni of Middlesex University
1965 births